= Hamilton Power Plant =

Hamilton Power Plant may refer to

- a power plant in Hamilton, Ohio, USA
- a former power plant in Hamilton, South Lanarkshire, Scotland
- Hamilton Power Station in Lowell, Massachusetts, USA
